The 1976 United States House of Representatives elections in South Carolina were held on November 2, 1976 to select six Representatives for two-year terms from the state of South Carolina.  All six incumbents were re-elected and the composition of the state delegation remained five Democrats and one Republican.

1st congressional district
Incumbent Democratic Congressman Mendel Jackson Davis of the 1st congressional district, in office since 1971, defeated Republican challenger Lonnie Rowell.

General election results

|-
| 
| colspan=5 |Democratic hold
|-

2nd congressional district
Incumbent Republican Congressman Floyd Spence of the 2nd congressional district, in office since 1971, defeated Democratic challenger Clyde B. Livingston.

General election results

|-
| 
| colspan=5 |Republican hold
|-

3rd congressional district
Incumbent Democratic Congressman Butler Derrick of the 3rd congressional district, in office since 1975, was unopposed in his bid for re-election.

General election results

|-
| 
| colspan=5 |Democratic hold
|-

4th congressional district
Incumbent Democratic Congressman James R. Mann of the 4th congressional district, in office since 1969, defeated Republican challenger Bob Watkins.

General election results

|-
| 
| colspan=5 |Democratic hold
|-

5th congressional district
Incumbent Democratic Congressman Kenneth Lamar Holland of the 5th congressional district, in office since 1975, defeated Republican challenger Bobby Richardson.

General election results

|-
| 
| colspan=5 |Democratic hold
|-

6th congressional district
Incumbent Democratic Congressman John Jenrette of the 6th congressional district, in office since 1975, defeated Republican challenger Edward Lunn Young.

General election results

|-
| 
| colspan=5 |Democratic hold
|-

See also
United States House elections, 1976
South Carolina's congressional districts

References

United States House of Representatives
1976
South Carolina